Kost or KOST may refer to:
 KOST, a radio station (103.5 FM) licensed to Los Angeles, California, United States
 KOST, original call letters for KILT-FM, Houston, Texas, United States
 Kost Castle, a castle in Czech Republic
 Kost, Minnesota, a community in the United States
 Kost (surname), German, Dutch, Polish and Ukrainian surname

People with the given name Kost
 Kost Human, South African rugby league player who represented his country in the 1995 World Cup
 Kost Lavro (born 1961), Ukrainian artist and illustrator
 Kost Levytsky (1859–1941), Ukrainian politician
 Kost Novytsky (born 1950), Ukrainian musician
 Fräulein Kost, a character in the musical Cabaret and the 1972 film adaptation